Joachim Kempin (born in 1942) is a German-born businessman and retired Senior Vice President of Microsoft Corporation. He ran Microsoft's division selling operating software to PC manufacturers for 15 years. He is also the author of Resolve and Fortitude: Microsoft's "Secret Power Broker" Breaks His Silence.

Early career 
In 1972, he joined Digital Equipment Corporation (DEC) in Munich, Germany as an instructor to teach computer programming classes to customers. He later ran DEC's training center in Munich, and became a marketing manager in DEC's training division headquartered in Bedford, Massachusetts. After a short spell at National Semiconductors, he joined Apple's team in Paris as European marketing manager. He later joined a new software company called Microsoft and accepted a General Manager position for its newly found German subsidiary.

Microsoft 
Upon joining, he moved through the still small company and was promoted to run Microsoft's division dealing with PC manufacturers. Headquartered near Seattle, Washington, he soon belonged to Microsoft's executive team and was promoted to Senior Vice President of Microsoft in 1990. In his job he developed relationships with Microsoft's PC manufacturers and operating software distribution partners worldwide. Journalists called him "Microsoft's Secret Power Broker"  and Bill Gates' "Enforcer"  who was "wielding Microsoft’s pricing sword".   He described part of his job as "hitting the OEMs hard... with anti-Linux" The Department of Justice took an interest in how he ran his portion of Microsoft, and he wound up as a witness to defend the company's business practices during the 1998–2002 Microsoft antitrust trial. He retired in 2002 from the company and joined several boards as a business advisor, including the National Bureau of Asian Research.

Author 
In January, 2013, Joachim Kempin released a controversial tell-all book about his time in Microsoft. It has received media attention, and Kempin has been outspoken in the press criticizing Microsoft's current leadership. In a Reuters interview with Bill Rigby, Kempin said, "Microsoft's board is a lame duck board, has been forever. They hire people to help them administer the company, but not to lead the company. That's the problem".

Kempin's book release has gotten him television interviews on Bloomberg TV  and Fox Business.

References

Businesspeople from Munich
Microsoft people
1942 births
Living people
National Bureau of Asian Research